The Saskatchewan order of precedence is a nominal and symbolic hierarchy of important positions within the Canadian province of Saskatchewan. It has no legal standing but is used to dictate ceremonial protocol at events of a provincial nature.

The King of Canada (His Majesty Charles III)
The Lieutenant Governor of Saskatchewan (Russell Mirasty )
Members of the Canadian Royal Family
The Premier of Saskatchewan (Scott Moe)
The Chief Justice of Saskatchewan (Robert G. Richards)
Former Lieutenant Governors of Saskatchewan
Lynda Haverstock 
Gordon Barnhart 
Vaughn Solomon Schofield, 
Former Premiers of Saskatchewan (not including those still holding other positions)
Grant Devine, 
Roy Romanow 
Lorne Calvert, 
Brad Wall
Former Chief Justices of Saskatchewan (John Klebuc)
The Speaker of the Legislative Assembly (Randy Weekes)
The Deputy Premier (Donna Harpauer) and Members of the Executive Council
The Leader of the Opposition (Carla Beck)
The Chief Justice of the Court of King's Bench (Martel D. Popescul)
Court of Appeal and the Court of King's Bench:  the Justices of the two courts, in order of seniority of appointment to one of those courts.
Provincial Court: the Chief Judge, then the Associate Chief Judge(s), then Judges in order of seniority of appointment
The Members of the Legislative Assembly
Deputy Speaker (Joe Hargrave)
The Government House Leader, unless a member of the cabinet (Jeremy Harrison)
The Opposition House Leader (Vicki Mowat)
The other Members, with relative precedence to be determined by date of first election to the Legislature
Members of the Senate who represent Saskatchewan, relative precedence determined by date of appointment
Members of the House of Commons who represent Saskatchewan constituencies, with their relative precedence determined by date of first election
Aboriginal Leaders:
the Chief and Vice-Chiefs of the Federation of Sovereign Indigenous Nations (FSIN)
the senior officers of the Tribal Councils
the Chiefs of Saskatchewan First Nation Bands
equivalent Métis leaders
 Leaders of Faith Communities: the Archbishop, or Senior Bishop in the Province, of the Anglican Church of Canada; the Archbishop of Regina and Metropolitan, or the Senior Bishop in the Province, of the Roman Catholic Church; the Bishop of the Saskatoon Eparchy of the Ukrainian Catholic Church; the President, or the Past President or the President-Elect, of the Saskatchewan Conference of The United Church of Canada; the Bishop of the Saskatchewan Synod of the Evangelical Lutheran Church in Canada; the senior representatives in the Province of the Alliance, Baptist, Mennonite, Orthodox and Presbyterian Churches and of the Jewish, Muslim and Hindu Faiths. (Relative precedence among the various religious leaders is determined by the date of appointment or election to their present office.)
The Consular Corps in the Province, in the following order: Dean of the Consular Corps; Consuls-General; Consuls; Vice-Consuls; Consular Agents. (Relative precedence among them is determined by the date of their appointment.)
Mayors, with precedence given to the mayor of the host municipality and subsequent relative precedence determined by the date of first taking office. 
Senior Officials:
the Deputy Minister to the Premier
the Cabinet Secretary/Clerk of the Executive Council
the Clerk of the Legislative Assembly
the Ombudsman
the Provincial Auditor
the Chief Electoral Officer
the Children's Advocate
the Information and Privacy Commissioner
the Conflict of Interest Commissioner.
Deputy Ministers; then other senior Saskatchewan government officials with rank of Deputy Minister as determined by the Executive Council
Chief Executive Officers of Crown Corporations (relative precedence determined by date of appointment). 
University officials:
the Chancellor of the University of Saskatchewan
the Chancellor of the University of Regina
the President of the University of Saskatchewan
the President of the University of Regina
Police and Military:
the Commanding Officer of "F" Division, Royal Canadian Mounted Police
the Commanding Officer of Depot Division, Royal Canadian Mounted Police;
the President of the Saskatchewan Association of Chiefs of Police
the Wing Commander of 15 Wing Moose Jaw
the senior representative in Saskatchewan of 38 Canadian Brigade Group
the senior representative in Saskatchewan of Maritime Command

Sources

Table of Precedence for Saskatchewan

Saskatchewan